Marjo Tuulevi Matikainen-Kallström (born 3 February 1965 in Lohja) is a politician and former Finnish cross-country skier.

Politics

Matikainen-Kallström represents the National Coalition Party (Kokoomus) in Finland. From 1996 to 2004 she was a Member of the European Parliament, and since 2004 she has been a member of the Finnish Parliament.

Athletics

She had a very short but winning sporting career. In the six seasons she competed at a top international level, she won the World Cup three years in a row. At the 1984 Winter Olympics in Sarajevo, Matikainen-Kallström won a bronze medal in the relay aged just 19.

Four years later in Calgary she won bronze on the 10 km race, and in the 5 km sprint won gold after being in second place all race until the last kilometre before coming through to win, 1.3 seconds ahead of Tamara Tikhonova, who had to settle for silver. That same year she won another bronze medal in the relay.

At the 1987 FIS Nordic World Ski Championships in Oberstdorf, she won the 5 km and silver in the 10 km. Matikainen-Kallström finished her championship career with a fantastic 1989 FIS Nordic World Ski Championships on her home soil in Lahti, where she won the following medals:

Matikainen-Kallström also was the first winner of the women's 30 km event at the Holmenkollen ski festival in 1988.

Scholastics
She quit competition after these championships at the age of 24 to concentrate on her studies at the Helsinki University of Technology and on politics.

Cross-country skiing results
All results are sourced from the International Ski Federation (FIS).

Olympic Games
 4 medals – (1 gold, 3 bronze)

World Championships
 7 medals – (3 gold, 2 silver, 2 bronze)

World Cup

Season titles
 3 titles – (3 overall)

Season standings

Individual podiums
 8 victories 
 17 podiums

Team podiums

 1 victory 
 8 podiums

Note:   Until the 1999 World Championships and the 1994 Olympics, World Championship and Olympic races were included in the World Cup scoring system.

References

Holmenkollen winners since 1892 – click Vinnere for downloadable pdf file

External links

1965 births
Living people
People from Lohja
National Coalition Party politicians
Members of the Parliament of Finland (2003–07)
Members of the Parliament of Finland (2007–11)
Members of the Parliament of Finland (2011–15)
National Coalition Party MEPs
MEPs for Finland 1996–1999
MEPs for Finland 1999–2004
20th-century women MEPs for Finland
21st-century women MEPs for Finland
Cross-country skiers at the 1984 Winter Olympics
Cross-country skiers at the 1988 Winter Olympics
Finnish female cross-country skiers
Holmenkollen Ski Festival winners
Finnish sportsperson-politicians
Women members of the Parliament of Finland
Aalto University alumni
Olympic medalists in cross-country skiing
FIS Nordic World Ski Championships medalists in cross-country skiing
FIS Cross-Country World Cup champions
Medalists at the 1984 Winter Olympics
Medalists at the 1988 Winter Olympics
Olympic gold medalists for Finland
Olympic bronze medalists for Finland